Vlček (feminine Vlčková) is a Czech surname (literally "little wolf") and may refer to:
 Erik Vlček (born 1981), Slovak canoer
 Jiří Vlček (born 1978), Czech-Italian rower
 Josef Vlček (1900–1970), Czech footballer
 Ladislav Vlček (born 1981), Czech ice hockey player
 Miloslav Vlček (born 1961), Czech politician
 Petr Vlček (born 1973), Czech footballer
 Stanislav Vlček (born 1976), Czech footballer

See also
 

Czech-language surnames